The O'Shaughnessy Dam is located on the Scioto River near Dublin, Ohio, United States. The dam forms O'Shaughnessy Reservoir, which is a major source of drinking water for the city of Columbus. It was completed in 1925 following recommendations of then superintendent Jerry O'Shaughnessy (for whom the dam was named). At the time, the reservoir was described as "the finest inland waterway in the United States." The Columbus Zoo and Aquarium is located on the east bank of the reservoir, near the dam.

In 1990, the dam was listed on the National Register of Historic Places.

Hydroelectricity
The city of Columbus installed a hydroelectric operation on the west side of the dam, which was completed in 1987. The turbines can only be operated when there is sufficient flow, which means the dam cannot continuously produce electricity. With a head of 18 feet (5.5 m), the two turbines together produce 5 megawatts.

Despite numerous repair attempts the Hydroelectric Turbines  have remained offline for approximately 3 years (ostensibly as of August 2018). In January, 2021, The City of Columbus announced plans to repair the hydropower unit and restore the plant to full capacity by 2023.

References

External links

 USGS Real-Time Water Data: Scioto River below O'Shaughnessy Dam
Ohio DNR fishing map of O'Shaughnessy Reservoir

Hydroelectric power plants in Ohio
Dams in Ohio
Buildings and structures in Delaware County, Ohio
National Register of Historic Places in Delaware County, Ohio
Buildings and structures on the National Register of Historic Places in Ohio
Road bridges on the National Register of Historic Places in Ohio
Neoclassical architecture in Ohio
Dams completed in 1925
Energy infrastructure completed in 1925
United States local public utility dams